Wabanquot, Wabonaquod, Wah-bon-ah-quot, Wau-bon-a-quat or Wa-bon-o-quot (ca. 1830-1898) was an Ojibwa chief. Wabanquot (from the Ojibwe Waabaanakwad: White Cloud) was born at Gull Lake, Minnesota, around 1830. He succeeded to the office of chief of the Ojibwa at the death of his father, Waubojeeg, one of the principal chiefs for the Gull Lake Band of Mississippi Chippewa.

After the Dakota War of 1862, the Gull Lake Band was removed to the Leech Lake area. There, Wabanquot was considered by many to be the principal chief of the removed Mississippi bands of Chippewa. He was a signatory to the Treaty of Washington (1867), in which on June 14, 1868, he led his band to the White Earth Indian Reservation, where he lived until his death 30 years later.

Upon his supposed conversion to Christianity sometime in the 1870s, he adopted the name D.G. Wright after an Episcopalian benefactor, but he rarely used his English name; however, sometime in the 1890s before his death, he converted to Roman Catholicism.

Memorials
 Chief White Cloud State Monument, in Becker County, in Calvary Catholic Cemetery of the St. Benedict's Mission, a mile south of White Earth, honoring Chippewa Chief White Cloud, was established in 1909. The monument inscription says:

 The United States Navy tug USS Wabanquot, in service from 1945 to 1976, was named for him.

References

Department of the Navy Naval Historical Center Dictionary of American Naval Fighting Ships Wabanquot (ship namesake paragraph)
Treaty of Washington (1867)(digital copy at the Digital Kappler Project)

Native American leaders
Ojibwe people
1830s births
1898 deaths
White Earth Band of Ojibwe